Sakhuli (Sakhali) is a rural locality (a selo) in Kurumkansky District, Republic of Buryatia, Russia. The population was 427 as of 2010. There are 8 streets.

Geography 
Sakhuli is located 12 km northeast of Kurumkan (the district's administrative centre) by road. Mogoyto is the nearest rural locality.

References 

Rural localities in Kurumkansky District